Kate is a feminine given name. It is a short form of multiple feminine names, most notably Katherine but also Caitlin and others.

Translations and variations 
 Arabic: كيت
 Belarusian: Каця (Katsia), Кацярына (Katsiaryna)
 Bengali: কেট (Kēṭa)
 Bulgarian: Кейт (Keĭt), Катя (Katya)
 Chinese Simplified: 凯特 (Kǎitè)
 Chinese Traditional: 凱特 (Kǎitè)
 Croatian: Ina, Kata, Katica, Tina
 Czech: Katka, Kateřina, Kačka, Káťa, Kačenka, Káča, Kačí, Kačena
 Danish: Katja, Trine, Caja, Ina, Kaja, Karen, Karin, Karina
 Dutch: Kato, Cato, Ina, Katinka, Katja, Kaat, Rina, Tina, Trijntje, Karin, Tineke
 English: Kat, Kathi, Kathie, Kathy, Kay, Kit, Kitty, Kae, Kaye, Katey, Katie, Katy, Kayla, Kaety, Katee, Kaylee, Kayleen, Kaylyn, Kaytie
 Estonian: Kaisa, Kati, Keit, Riina, Triinu
 Finnish: Kaija, Kaisa, Kata, Kati, Katri, Riina, Kaarina, Karin
 Georgian: Eka 
 German: Cathrin, Catrin, Ina, Käthe, Kathrin, Katinka, Katja, Karen, Karin, Karina
 Greek: Καίτη (Kaíti̱)
 Gujarati: કેટ (Kēṭa)
 Hawaiian: Kalena 
 Hebrew: קייט
 Hindi: केट (Kēṭa)
 Hungarian: Katalin, Kata, Kati, Katalinka, Kató, Kitti
 Irish: Cáit, Ríona
 Italian: Catia, Katia, Rina 
 Japanese: ケイト (Keito)
 Kannada: ಕೇಟ್ (Kēṭ)
 Korean: 케이트 (Keiteu)
 Lithuanian: Katrė
 Macedonian: Кејт (Kejt)
 Marathi: केट (Kēṭa)
 Mongolian: Кейт (Kyeit)
 Nepali: केट (Kēṭa)
 Norwegian: Kari, Katja, Ina, Kaia, Kaja, Karen, Karin, Karina, Karine
 Persian: کیت
 Polish: Kasia, Karina
 Portuguese: Cátia, Kátia 
 Punjabi: ਕੇਟ (Kēṭa)
 Russian: Кейт (Keyt), Катенька (Katenka), Катерина (Katerina), Екатерина (Yekaterina), Катя (Katia), Катя (Katya)
 Scottish Gaelic: Ceit
 Serbian: Кata, Katarina
 Slovak: Katka, Katarína
 Slovene: Katica, Katja
 Swedish: Cajsa, Kai, Kajsa, Katja, Carin, Carina, Ina, Kaj, Kaja, Karin, Karina
 Tamil: கேட் (Kēṭ)
 Telugu: కేట్ (Kēṭ)
 Thai: เคท (Kheth)
 Ukrainian: Катерина (Kateryna) 
 Urdu: کیٹ
 Welsh: Cadi
 Yiddish: קייט (Qyyt)

People

In literature
 Kate Atkinson (born 1951), Engish author
 Kate Chopin (1850–1904), American author
 Kate DiCamillo (born 1964), American children's author
 Kate Field (1838–1896), American journalist and actress
 Kate Greenaway (1846–1901), English author
 Kate E. Griswold (c. 1869–1???), American editor, publisher, proprietor 
 Kate Simpson Hayes (1856-1945), Canadian writer, teacher, milliner, legislative librarian
 Kate Millett (1934–2017), American feminist writer and activist
 Kate Mosse (born 1961), English author and broadcaster
 Kate O'Brien (novelist) (1897–1974), Irish novelist
 Kate Sanborn (1839–1917), American author, teacher, lecturer 
 Kate Seelye, American journalist specializing in coverage of the Middle East
 Kate Brownlee Sherwood (1841-1914), American poet, journalist, translator
 Kate Stone (1841–1907), American diarist
 Kate L. Turabian (1893–1987), American non-fiction writer and educator
 Kate Vitasek (born 1968), American author and educator
 Kate Douglas Wiggin (1856-1923), American educator, author of children's stories

In music
 Kate Alexa (born 1988), Australian singer
 Kate Bush (born 1958), English singer-songwriter
 Kate Ceberano (born 1966), Australian jazz singer
 Kate Guldbrandsen (born 1965), Norwegian singer
 Kate Havnevik (born 1975), Norwegian singer-songwriter
 Kate Maberly (born 1982), English singer-songwriter and actress
 Kate Miller-Heidke (born 1981), Australian singer-songwriter and actress
 Kate Nash (born 1987), English singer-songwriter
 Kate Pierson (born 1958), American singer and musician 
 Kate Ryan (born 1980), Belgian singer-songwriter
 Kate Rusby (born 1973), English folk singer-songwriter
 Kate Smith (1907–1986), American singer
 Kate Taylor (born 1949), American singer and songwriter
 Kate Tunstall (known as KT Tunstall), Scottish singer-songwriter
 Kate Voegele (born 1986), American singer-songwriter and actress
 Kate Wolf (1942–1986), American folk singer-songwriter

Athletes
 Kate Allenby (born 1974), British Modern Pentathlete
 Kate Gaze (born 1990), Australian basketball player
 Kate Horne (born 1954), Canadian curler
 Kate Howarth (soccer) (born 1991), American soccer player
 Kate Howey (born 1973), English judoka
 Kate Jobson (born 1937), Swedish swimmer
 Kate Markgraf (born 1976), American soccer player
 Kate Reed (born 1982), British long-distance runner
 Kate Starre (born 1971), Australian field hockey player

In film and television
 Kate Adie (born 1945), English television news correspondent
 Kate Beckinsale (born 1973), English actress
 Kate Beirness (born 1984), Canadian television sportscaster
 Kate Berlant (born 1987), American comedian and actress
 Cate Blanchett (born 1969), Australian actress
 Kate Bosworth (born 1983), American actress
 Kate Bristol (born 1990), American voice actress
 Kate Burton (actress) (born 1957), British-American actress
 Kate Capshaw (born 1953), American actress
 Kate Copstick (born 1956), Scottish actress and director
 Kate del Castillo (born 1972), Mexican actress
 Kate Garraway (born 1967), English television and radio presenter
 Kate Gerbeau (born 1968), English television presenter and newsreader
 Kate Gosselin (born 1975), American television personality
 Kate Hackett, American actress
 Kate Harrington (1902–1978), American actress
 Kate Henshaw (born 1961), Nigerian actress
 Kate Hewlett (born 1976), Canadian actress
 Kate Hudson (born 1979), American actress
Kate Humble (born 1968), British television presenter
 Kate Isitt (born 1965), English actress
 Kate Jackson (born 1948), American actress
 Kate Lawler (born 1980), English television presenter and Big Brother winner
 Kate Lonergan (born 1962), English actress
 Kate Maberly (born 1982), English actress
 Kate Mara (born 1983), American actress
 Kate McKinnon (born 1984), American actress and comedian
 Kate Micucci (born 1980), American actress, comedian and musician
 Kate Mulgrew (born 1955), American actress
 Kate O'Mara (1939–2014), English actress
 Kate Ritchie (born 1978), Australian actress and radio personality
 Kate Smith, Australian theatrical star, 2006/2007 Wheel Of Fortune co-hostess
 Kate Smith (presenter), Northern Irish journalist and television presenter
 Kate Thornton (born 1973), English journalist and television presenter
 Kate Tsui (born 1979), Hong Kong actress
 Kate Valdez (born 2000), Filipino actress
 Kate Vernon (born 1961), Canadian actress
 Kate Walsh (actress) (born 1967), American actress
 Kate Walsh (presenter) (born 1981), British television presenter
 Kate Winslet (born 1975), English actress
 Kate Moss, UK actress and model
 Kate Upton, UK actress and model
 Catherine Kamau, Kenyan award-winning actress popularly known as “Kate Actress”

Other
 Kate Warner, Australian politician 
 Catherine, Duchess of Cambridge (born 1982), wife of Prince William, Duke of Cambridge; formerly Kate Middleton
 Kate Bisschop-Swift (1834–1928), Dutch painter
 Kate Calvin (1856–1936), American academic
 Kate Cayley, Canadian writer and theatre director
 Kate Booth (1858–1955), English Salvationist and evangelist, eldest daughter of William and Catherine Booth
 Big Nose Kate (1850–1940), Hungarian-born prostitute and longtime companion and common-law wife of Old West gunfighter Doc Holliday, born Mary Katherine Horony
 Kate M. Gordon (1861–1932), American suffragette
 Kate Grigorieva (born 1989), Russian supermodel
 Kate Hennig (born 1961 or 1962), Canadian actress and playwright
 Kate Horn (1826–1896), Canadian stage actress and director
 Kate Lushington, Canadian theatre artist and teacher
 Kate Moss (born 1974), English supermodel
 Kate Nicholl (born 1988), Lord Mayor of Belfast
 Kate Osamor (born 1968), British Labour Party politician
 Kate Sheppard (1848–1934), New Zealand suffragette
 Kate Spade (1962–2018), American designer and businesswoman
 Kate Tyrrell (1863–1921), Irish sea captain and owner of a shipping company

Fictional characters
 Kate, a character from the 1989 film All Dogs Go to Heaven
 Kate, a character in 1993 action/martial arts movie Showdown
 Kate, one of the two main characters in the 2022 American comedy movie Sam & Kate
 Kate, the older sister of the titular character of the Australian children's series, Ferry Boat Fred
 Kate Austen, on the TV series Lost
 Kate Beckett, the main female character on the TV show Castle
 Kate Beringer, a character in the Gremlins franchise
 Hawkeye (Kate Bishop), a Marvel Comics character
 Kate Connolly from Maggie Stiefvater's The Scorpio Races
 Kate Connor, in the British soap opera Coronation Street
 Kate Denson, from Dead by Daylight
 Kate Denali, from the Twilight series
 Kate Ditchburn, in the TV comedy Blackadder II
 Kate Fiztgerald, main character of the novel and film My Sister's Keeper
 Katie Holt, from Voltron: Legendary Defender
 Kate Kane, the second Batwoman from DC Comics
 Kate Lockley, on the TV show Angel
 Kate McReary, in the video game Grand Theft Auto IV
 Kate McCallister, the main character's mother in the Home Alone franchise
 Kate Mitchell, in the British soap opera EastEnders
 Kate Morgan, in the TV series 24
 Kate Patrick, a character from Hollyoaks
 Kate Ramsay, a character in the Australian soap opera Neighbours
 Kate "D.W." Read, a character from Arthur
 Kate Roberts, a character in the American soap opera Days of Our Lives
 Manhunter (Kate Spencer), a DC Comics heroine
 Katherine "Kate" Summers-Stratton, a character in the American sitcom television series Silver Spoons
 Kate Takenomiya, from Akira Hiramoto's Prison School
 Kate Thompson, a character in the 1980 comedy film The Gods Must Be Crazy
 Kate Tomten, the eldest of the Tomten kids in the children's show Noddy

References

English feminine given names
Croatian feminine given names
English given names
Given names of Greek language origin

hu:Kata (keresztnév)